Jay Lewis Rogers (August 3, 1888 to July 1, 1964) was a Major League Baseball catcher. Rogers played for the New York Yankees in the  season. In five games, he had no hits in 8 at-bats, playing catcher.

He batted and threw right-handed.

He was born in Sandusky, New York and died in Carlisle, New York.

External links

1888 births
1964 deaths
Major League Baseball catchers
Baseball players from New York (state)
New York Yankees players
Richmond Colts players